Inspector Steine is a radio comedy drama series written by Lynne Truss and produced by Sweet Talk for BBC Radio 4. The producer is Karen Rose and music is by Anthony May.

Set in a police station in Brighton in the 1950s, it tells the story of Inspector Steine (Michael Fenton Stevens) and his colleagues Sergeant Brunswick (John Ramm) and Constable Twitten (Matt Green), plus the station charlady Mrs Groynes (Jan Ravens in Series 1 and Samantha Spiro from Series 2 onwards).

Guest stars have included Janet Ellis, Mark Heap, Allan Corduner and Carla Mendonca.

The programme was inspired by the opening rolling caption about crime in Brighton at the beginning of the film Brighton Rock, which claimed that Brighton was now (in the 1950s) free of crime. Lynne Truss has written that: "This highly unrealistic reassurance prefacing Brighton Rock was the inspiration for the comedy series Inspector Steine...I wanted to write about a celebrity police inspector in the 1950s who innocently (and touchingly) believed precisely what he had been told at the movies"

Four series of six episodes each were broadcast from 2007 to 2011, followed by a one-off Christmas episode "The Christmas of Inspector Steine" which was broadcast as part of the Afternoon Drama strand on BBC Radio 4 on 23 December 2013.

Series 1

Series 2, The Casebook of Inspector Steine

Series 3, The Adventures of Inspector Steine

Series 4, The Return of Inspector Steine

Christmas special, The Christmas of Inspector Steine

Audiobooks
Series 1 was released by BBC Audiobooks on 3 March 2008.
Series 2 was released by BBC Audiobooks on 12 February 2009.
Series 3 was released by BBC Audiobooks on 8 April 2010.
Series 4 was released digitally by AudioGO on 15 July 2013.

References

External links
 
 The Casebook of Inspector Steine
 The Adventures of Inspector Steine
 The Return of Inspector Steine
 The Christmas of Inspector Steine
 Article on Inspector Steine on Lynne Truss' website
 Inspector Steine photographs on Lynne Truss' website
  (archived)
 Website of Lynne Truss's agent David Higham
 Website of actor Matt Green
 Website of composer Anthony May

BBC Radio comedy programmes
BBC Radio 4 programmes